Leifur Ásgeirsson (25 May 1903 – 19 August 1990) was the first Icelandic mathematician to gain major international recognition.

Education and career
Ásgeirsson graduated in 1927 from Reykjavik Junior College and received his doctorate in 1933 from the University of Göttingen. His doctoral advisor was Richard Courant. From 1931 to 1943 Ásgeirrson was the head of a district school in Laugar, located in southwestern Iceland's Reykjadalur Valley east of Reykjavík. In 1936 he was an invited speaker at the International Congress of Mathematicians in Oslo. At the University of Iceland he was appointed in 1943 a lecturer in mathematics and in 1945 a full professor of mathematics.

The journal  was founded in 1953 with Ásgeirsson as one of the founding editors.

Selected publications

References

1903 births
1990 deaths
Leifur Asgeirsson
PDE theorists
Leifur Ásgeirsson
University of Göttingen alumni
Leifur Ásgeirsson
Leifur Asgeirsson